

Oskar-Hubert Dennhardt (30 June 1915 – 19 June 2014) was a German Major in the Wehrmacht during World War II. He was a recipient of the Knight's Cross of the Iron Cross with Oak Leaves of Nazi Germany.

Dennhardt served in the Landtag of Schleswig-Holstein as a Christian Democratic Union politician after World War II. He rejoined the military service in the West German Bundeswehr in 1955, retiring in 1971 holding the rank of Brigadegeneral. He commanded the Panzergrenadierbrigade 16 from 1 November 1965 to 31 March 1968 and was deputy commander of the 6th Panzergrenadier Division.

Awards and decorations
 Wehrmacht Long Service Award 4th Class (28 May 1938)
 Iron Cross (1939) 2nd Class (2 June 1940) & 1st Class (8 September 1940)
 Wound Badge (1939) in Black (26 August 1941); in Silver (29 August 1942);  in Gold (5 October 1942)
 Infantry Assault Badge in Bronze (1 May 1942)
 Eastern Front Medal (3 August 1942)
 German Cross in Gold on 12 February 1943 as Hauptmann in the III./Grenadier-Regiment 53 (motorized)
 Close Combat Clasp in Bronze (6 December 1943) & in Silver (15 April 1945)
 Knight's Cross of the Iron Cross with Oak Leaves
 Knight's Cross on 18 March 1942 as Major and commander of the II./Grenadier-Regiment 11 and regiment leader
 (870th) Oak Leaves on 9 May 1945 as Major and leader of Grenadier-Regiment 1143
 Order of Merit of the Federal Republic of Germany 1st Class (10 May 1971)

Notes

References

Citations

Bibliography

 
 
 
 
 

1915 births
2014 deaths
Recipients of the Gold German Cross
Recipients of the Knight's Cross of the Iron Cross with Oak Leaves
Officers Crosses of the Order of Merit of the Federal Republic of Germany
Christian Democratic Union of Germany politicians
Members of the Landtag of Schleswig-Holstein
People from Markranstädt
People from the Kingdom of Saxony
German Army officers of World War II
Brigadier generals of the German Army
Military personnel from Saxony